General Sir Alexander Richard Hamilton Hutchison,  (2 August 1871 – 1930) was a Royal Marines officer who served as Adjutant-General Royal Marines.

Military career
Hutchison was commissioned into the Royal Marine Light Infantry on 28 March 1890. Promoted to captain on 6 December 1897, he fought in the Second Boer War. He served as Deputy Assistant Adjutant-General at Headquarters Royal Marine Forces in 1915 and then saw action in the Gallipoli Campaign later that year before becoming Assistant Adjutant-General Royal Marines in July 1918 during the latter stages of the First World War.

Hutchison went on to be Adjutant-General Royal Marines from March 1924 before retiring in December 1927.

References

1871 births
People from Colombo
1930 deaths
Royal Marines generals of World War I
Royal Marines generals
Knights Companion of the Order of the Bath
Companions of the Order of St Michael and St George
Companions of the Distinguished Service Order
British military personnel of the Second Boer War